Douglas Frederick Keans (born January 7, 1958) is a Canadian former professional ice hockey goaltender who played nine seasons in the National Hockey League with the Los Angeles Kings and Boston Bruins between 1980 and 1988.

Playing career
In his youth, he played in the 1970 and 1971 Quebec International Pee-Wee Hockey Tournament with a minor ice hockey team from Barrie.

Following a solid junior career with the Oshawa Generals, Keans was selected in the 6th round (94th overall) of the 1978 NHL Entry Draft by the Los Angeles Kings. He would make his debut in the 1979–80 season, posting a stellar 2.47 goals-against average in 10 games. Keans spent parts of four seasons with the Kings, but was inconsistent and never fully established himself, serving as one of several backups to incumbent starter Mario Lessard. His best season was 1981–82, when he posted an 8–10–7 record and 4.30 GAA in 31 appearances.

Keans was claimed off waivers by the Boston Bruins prior to the 1983–84 season to back up starter Pete Peeters. In Boston, he would finally settle down and play consistent hockey, establishing himself as one of the better backup goaltenders in the NHL. In his first season as a Bruin, he posted a 19–8–3 record with an excellent 3.10 GAA as well as his first two career shutouts.

While Boston cycled through starting goalies during the mid-1980s, Keans was a fixture as the backup, routinely outplaying the starter. He would spend 5 seasons in Boston, backing up Peeters, Pat Riggin, Bill Ranford and Réjean Lemelin. During this period he never won less than 14 games in a season, never finished with a record below .500, and compiled a stellar 84–46–13 record. Despite his solid performances, however, he was considered too small at 5'7" to be relied upon as a #1 netminder.

At the trade deadline near the end of the 1987–88 season, Boston would acquire star netminder Andy Moog from the Edmonton Oilers. Lemelin was now the backup, and Keans was relegated to the #3 position and sent to the minors. He would spend another season in the minors before retiring in 1989, although he would come out of retirement for two brief stints in low-end minor pro during the 1990s.

Keans finished his 9-year NHL career with 96–64–26 record and 3.50 GAA in 210 career appearances, along with 4 shutouts.

Career statistics

Regular season and playoffs

References

External links 

Profile at hockeydraftcentral.com

1958 births
Living people
Baltimore Skipjacks players
Binghamton Dusters players
Boston Bruins players
Canadian ice hockey goaltenders
Houston Apollos players
Ice hockey people from Ontario
Jacksonville Bullets players
Los Angeles Kings draft picks
Los Angeles Kings players
Maine Mariners players
New Haven Nighthawks players
Oklahoma City Stars players
Oshawa Generals players
Sportspeople from Pembroke, Ontario
Springfield Indians players